Kaasstengels, Kastengel or kue keju are a Dutch cheese snack in the shape of sticks. Owed to its colonial links to the Netherlands, kaasstengels are also commonly found in Indonesia. The name refers to its ingredients, shape and origin; kaas is the Dutch word for "cheese", while stengels means "sticks". Unlike most cookies, kaasstengels taste savoury and salty instead of sweet. 

In Indonesia kaasstengels, together with nastar and putri salju are the popular kue kering ("dried kue", or cookie), during festive occasion, such as Natal (Christmas) and Lebaran (Eid al Fitr). It is one of several Dutch delicacies that has been adopted into Indonesian cuisine since colonial era.

Recipe

Kaasstengels' dough is made of a fine mixture of butter or margarine with egg yolks, with addition of grated cheese, then mixed together with flour, cornstarch and baking powder. The kind of cheese being use might be edam, gouda or cheddar. 

The dough is rolled into small rectangles, brushed with egg yolk, sprinkled with grated cheese, and then baked. Nutritional yeast can be used  as a substitute for cheese to make it suitable for a vegan diet. These pieces of kaasstengels must be kept in an airtight container, e.g. tin, plastic or glass container, to maintain its freshness and crumbly texture.

Trivia
Kaasstengels are not to be confused with Kaastengels, a Dutch brand of deep fried fingerfood. Kaastengels resemble spring rolls the size of a finger, filled with cheese. Hence the name, derived from the Dutch words kaas (cheese) and tengels (fingers).

See also

 Nastar
 Klappertaart
 Spekkoek
 Poffertjes
 List of cookies

References

External links

 Kaasstengels (Cheese Shortbread) recipe
 Kaasstengels recipe (in Dutch)
 Kastengel recipes (in Indonesian)

Cookies
Dutch cuisine
Dutch words and phrases
Indonesian snack foods
Kue
Cheese desserts